Rick Black is a former award-winning Fullback and Grey Cup Champion in the Canadian Football League.

A graduate of Mount Allison University, Black joined the Ottawa Rough Riders in 1963. He was the starting punter during his rookie season (79 punts for a 36.9 yard average) and on the strength of his kicking, won the Gruen Trophy as best rookie in the East (this at a time when only Canadians were eligible for the award.) He later developed into a reliable reserve fullback, his best year being 1965 when he rushed for 480 yards. In total, he rushed for 1309 yards, caught 28 passes and scored 12 touchdowns. Black retired October 2, 1968, missing the Grey Cup championship game that season.

In 2003 he was sentenced to 2 years in jail for fraud, a charge he vehemently denied.

References

1943 births
Living people
Canadian football fullbacks
Canadian football punters
Ottawa Rough Riders players
Mount Allison University alumni
Mount Allison Mounties football players
Players of Canadian football from Ontario
Canadian football people from Ottawa
Canadian Football League Rookie of the Year Award winners